Noah Feil (born 16 September 1998) is a German footballer who plays as a midfielder for 1860 Munich II.

References

External links
 Profile on FuPa.net

1998 births
People from Aalen
Sportspeople from Stuttgart (region)
Footballers from Baden-Württemberg
Living people
German footballers
Association football midfielders
VfR Aalen players
TSV 1860 Munich II players
3. Liga players
Oberliga (football) players
Bayernliga players